The Telfer School of Management (French: École de gestion Telfer) is a business school located at the University of Ottawa in Ottawa, Ontario, Canada. The school is named in honour of one university alumnus, Ian Telfer (MBA 1976), who made a significant donation to the University of Ottawa. The donation of $25 million to the school's business program was the largest donation in Canadian history to be given to a business school, until Steven Smith's donation of $50 Million to the Queen's School of Business.

Degree programs
The school offers a number of undergraduate and graduate degree programs. The undergraduate programs include Accounting, MIS, e-Business, Entrepreneurship, Finance, Human Resource Management, International Business, Management and Marketing options that all earn a Baccalaureate of Commerce (BCom). The graduate programs include the Master's of Business Administration (MBA), Joint MBA-LLB Option, Executive Master's of Business Administration (EMBA), Master of Science in Management, Master of Science in Health Systems  and Master of Health Administration (MHA). The school also offers Inter-disciplinary graduate programs - Masters in Engineering Management, E-Business/ E-Commerce and Systems Science.

Accreditations
The Telfer School of Management is one of only three schools in North America with triple accreditation. It is fully accredited by the AACSB (United States), the Association of MBAs (United Kingdom), and the EFMD (EQUIS) (Europe).

Building

The school shares the newly constructed Desmarais Building (fr. Pavillon Desmarais), designed by Moriyama & Teshima Architects, with the Faculty of Arts. Construction of this new facility was made possible in part by a generous $15-million contribution from Mr. Paul Desmarais Sr., a graduate of the Telfer School of Management (BCom 1950). The Desmarais Building was completed in 2007.

Research Centres
 Family Enterprise Legacy Institute
 Thriving Organizations Research Collective 
 Centre for a Responsible Wealth Transition 
 IBM Centre for Business Analytics and Performance
 Centre on Governance
 Mobile Emergency Triage (MET) Research Program

Laboratories
 Knowledge Discovery and Data Mining Laboratory (KDD)
 Emerging Technological and Innovation Management Laboratory (ETIM)
 Market Place for Safe and Fair Trade (e-MP)
 MET Research: Computing Laboratory to Support Clinical decision Making at the Point of Care in the Emergency Department

Research Networks
 Canadian Fisheries, Oceans, and Aquaculture Management (C-FOAM)
 Ocean Management Research Network (OMRN)

Rankings

In the 2006 ReportED Global Business School Ranking, the Telfer School of Management has been ranked 70th in the world and 6th among Canadian universities, for its MBA program.

The 2004 Financial Times global survey of EMBA programs ranked the U of O Executive MBA 65th out of 220 worldwide. In the 2007 rankings, the university placed 87th out of the top 90 EMBA programs.

The Telfer School of Management has also ranked among the Financial Times Top 150 business schools for the last four consecutive years (2004-2007).

The Corporate Knights magazine 2005 survey of business schools ranked the university's undergraduate program 4th in Canada. In the 2007 survey of business and law rankings, the undergraduate business program placed 10th. In the 2011 survey, the Telfer School of Management ranked 5th for its undergraduate business program (the Telfer BCom) and 8th for its MBA Program (the Telfer MBA). The rankings use additional components of social and environmental impact management infused into their curricula.

The Telfer School of Management is featured in the 2011 Edition of The Best 300 Business Schools Worldwide by Princeton Review, which produces test preparation, such as the SAT's and information regarding college admissions. The Telfer School of Management has been included in the Princeton Review's ranking of top business schools since 2005.
According to the Ranking Web of Business School, the Telfer School of Management is currently ranked 123 in the world.

Alumni
 Paul Desmarais Sr. (B.Com. 1950), chairman of the executive committee, Power Corporation of Canada
 Harley Finkelstein (MBA 2009), president, Shopify
 Ian Telfer (MBA 1976), former chairman of the board and director, Goldcorp Inc.
 Paul Vallée (B.Com. 1994), founder, chairman and chief executive officer, Pythian Group
 Sean Wise, managing director, Wise Mentor Capital

References

Business schools in Canada
University of Ottawa
1969 establishments in Ontario
Educational institutions established in 1969
Accounting schools in Canada